This is a list of the mammal species recorded in South Ossetia.

The following tags are used to highlight each species' conservation status as assessed by the International Union for Conservation of Nature:

Some species were assessed using an earlier set of criteria. Species assessed using this system have the following instead of near threatened and least concern categories:

Order: Rodentia (rodents) 

Suborder: Sciurognathi
Family: Sciuridae (squirrels)
Subfamily: Sciurinae
Tribe: Sciurini
Genus: Sciurus
 Caucasian squirrel, S. anomalus LC
Subfamily: Xerinae
Tribe: Marmotini
Genus: Spermophilus
 Caucasian mountain ground squirrel, Spermophilus musicus 
 Little ground squirrel, Spermophilus pygmaeus 
Family: Gliridae (dormice)
Subfamily: Leithiinae
Genus: Dryomys
 Forest dormouse, Dryomys nitedula LR/nt
Subfamily: Glirinae
Genus: Glis
 European edible dormouse, Glis glis LR/nt
Family: Dipodidae (jerboas)
Subfamily: Allactaginae
Genus: Allactaga
 Small five-toed jerboa, Allactaga elater 
Subfamily: Sicistinae
Genus: Sicista
 Northern birch mouse, Sicista betulina LR/nt
 Caucasian birch mouse, Sicista caucasica 
 Kazbeg birch mouse, Sicista kazbegica DD
Family: Cricetidae
Subfamily: Cricetinae
Genus: Cricetus
 European hamster, Cricetus cricetus 
 Ciscaucasian hamster, Mesocricetus raddei 
Subfamily: Arvicolinae
Genus: Chionomys
 Caucasian snow vole, Chionomys gud LR/nt
 Robert's snow vole, Chionomys roberti LR/nt
Genus: Ellobius
 Transcaucasian mole vole, Ellobius lutescens 
Genus: Microtus
 Altai vole, Microtus obscurus 
Family: Muridae (mice, rats, voles, gerbils, hamsters, etc.)
Subfamily: Murinae
Genus: Apodemus
 Striped field mouse, Apodemus agrarius 
 Yellow-breasted field mouse, Apodemus fulvipectus 
 Black Sea field mouse, Apodemus ponticus 
 Ural field mouse, Apodemus uralensis 
Genus: Micromys
 Harvest mouse, Micromys minutus LR/nt

Order: Erinaceomorpha (hedgehogs and gymnures) 

The order Erinaceomorpha contains a single family, Erinaceidae, which comprise the hedgehogs and gymnures. The hedgehogs are easily recognised by their spines.

Family: Erinaceidae (hedgehogs)
Subfamily: Erinaceinae
Genus: Erinaceus
 Southern white-breasted hedgehog, Erinaceus concolor

Order: Soricomorpha (shrews, moles, and solenodons) 

The "shrew-forms" are insectivorous mammals. The shrews and solenodons closely resemble mice.

Family: Soricidae (shrews)
Subfamily: Crocidurinae
Genus: Crocidura
 Gueldenstaedt's shrew, Crocidura gueldenstaedtii 
 Bicolored shrew, Crocidura leucodon 
 Lesser white-toothed shrew, Crocidura suaveolens 
Tribe: Soricini
Genus: Sorex
 Eurasian pygmy shrew, Sorex minutus 
 Radde's shrew, Sorex raddei 
 Caucasian pygmy shrew, Sorex volnuchini

Order: Chiroptera (bats) 

The bats' most distinguishing feature is that their forelimbs are developed as wings, making them the only mammals capable of flight.

Family: Vespertilionidae
Subfamily: Myotinae
Genus: Myotis
 Bechstein's bat, Myotis bechsteini VU
 Lesser mouse-eared bat, Myotis blythii 
 Geoffroy's bat, Myotis emarginatus VU
 Natterer's bat, Myotis nattereri 
Subfamily: Vespertilioninae
Genus: Barbastella
 Barbastelle, Barbastella barbastellus VU
Genus: Eptesicus
 Northern bat, Eptesicus nilssoni 
Genus: Nyctalus
 Greater noctule bat, Nyctalus lasiopterus LR/nt
 Lesser noctule, Nyctalus leisleri LR/nt
Genus: Pipistrellus
 Nathusius' pipistrelle, Pipistrellus nathusii 
Genus: Plecotus
 Brown long-eared bat, Plecotus auritus 
Subfamily: Miniopterinae
Genus: Miniopterus
 Schreibers' long-fingered bat, Miniopterus schreibersii LC
Family: Rhinolophidae
Subfamily: Rhinolophinae
Genus: Rhinolophus
 Mediterranean horseshoe bat, Rhinolophus euryale VU
 Greater horseshoe bat, Rhinolophus ferrumequinum LR/nt
 Lesser horseshoe bat, Rhinolophus hipposideros LC
 Mehely's horseshoe bat, Rhinolophus mehelyi VU

Order: Carnivora (carnivorans) 

The majority of the species of carnivorans feed primarily on meat. They have a characteristic skull shape and dentition.

Suborder: Feliformia
Family: Felidae (cats)
Subfamily: Felinae
Genus: Felis
 Wildcat, Felis silvestris LC
Genus: Lynx
 Eurasian lynx, Lynx lynx NT
Subfamily: Pantherinae
Genus: Panthera
 Leopard, Panthera pardus LC
Suborder: Caniformia
Family: Canidae (dogs, foxes)
Genus: Vulpes
 Red fox, Vulpes vulpes LC
Genus: Canis
 Gray wolf, Canis lupus LC
Family: Ursidae (bears)
Genus: Ursus
 Brown bear, Ursus arctos 
Family: Mustelidae (mustelids)
Genus: Mustela
 Stoat, Mustela erminea 
 Steppe polecat, Mustela eversmannii 
 European mink, Mustela lutreola EN
 Least weasel, Mustela nivalis 
Genus: Vormela
 Marbled polecat, Vormela peregusna 
Genus: Martes
 Beech marten, Martes foina 
 Pine marten, Martes martes 
Genus: Meles
 Caucasian badger, M. canescens 
Genus: Lutra
 European otter, Lutra lutra NT
Family: Phocidae (earless seals)
Genus: Monachus
 Mediterranean monk seal, Monachus monachus CR

Order: Artiodactyla (even-toed ungulates) 

 

The even-toed ungulates are ungulates whose weight is borne about equally by the third and fourth toes, rather than mostly or entirely by the third as in perissodactyls.

Family: Cervidae (deer)
Subfamily: Cervinae
Genus: Cervus
 Red deer, C. elaphus 
Subfamily: Capreolinae
Genus: Alces
 Moose, A. alces  extirpated
Caucasian moose, A. a. caucasicus 
Family: Bovidae (bovids)
Subfamily: Caprinae
Genus: Capra
 Wild goat, C. aegagrus 
 West Caucasian tur, C. caucasica 
 East Caucasian tur, C. cylindricornis 
Genus: Ovis
 Argali, O. ammon 
Genus: Rupicapra
 Chamois, R. rupicapra

See also
List of chordate orders
Lists of mammals by region
Mammal classification

Notes

References

South Ossetia
M
Mammals
South Ossetia
South Ossetia